Arceuthobium gillii, common name "Chihuahua pine dwarf mistletoe," is a parasitic plant found in Arizona, New Mexico, Chihuahua, Sonora and Sinaloa. It is found mostly on the Chihuahua pine, Pinus leiophylla var. chihuahuana.

The species was named in honor of Lake Shore Gill, an authority on the genus.

References

gillii
Parasitic plants
Flora of Arizona
Flora of New Mexico
Flora of Sinaloa
Flora of Sonora
Flora of Chihuahua (state)
Plants described in 1964